The Deposition from the Cross is an altarpiece, completed in 1521, depicting the Deposition of Christ by the Italian Renaissance painter Rosso Fiorentino. The painting is dated and signed: RUBEUS FLOR. A.S. MDXXI. It is broadly considered to be the artist's masterpiece. Painted in oil on wood, the painting was previously located in the Duomo of Volterra, but has been moved to the town art gallery, Pinacoteca Comunale.

Interpretation
This painting has often been compared to the fellow Mannerist painter Pontormo's near contemporary (1528) treatment of the same subject in his Deposition canvas in Florence.

Unlike Pontormo's bright coloration and unitary collection of billowing figures, the Fiorentino depiction has two arenas: above is an Escher-like geometric struggle of laborers on ladders, removing the crucified Christ, while below, the women and men are subsumed in grief. Mary, pale and downcast, collapses in the arms of two women. Mary Magdalen in bright red, swoons to hug the Madonna's legs. A grief-stricken apostle turns his face away. The somber landscape is virtually barren. One reviewer describes the scene as "violent suffering ...rendered by extreme expression, the concatenation of angular bodies, and the dazzling light that sharply draws clear folds on the clothing." Another states that this is the prototype of early-Mannerism, with "no logical spatial connection between the figures, the cross and ladders; the size of the figures appears arbitrarily chosen, and their elongated bodies and small heads" distort classical proportions.

Rosso would go on to paint a second, darker and more crowded Deposition for the church of San Lorenzo, Sansepolcro in Sansepolcro.

References

1521 paintings
Rosso
Paintings of the Virgin Mary
Paintings depicting Mary Magdalene
Paintings in the Pinacoteca e museo civico di Volterra
Altarpieces
Paintings by Rosso Fiorentino